Zach Palmquist (born December 9, 1990) is an American professional ice hockey defenseman who is currently a free agent. He previously played for the Lehigh Valley Phantoms of the American Hockey League (AHL).

Playing career
Previously, he played four years at the collegiate level for the Minnesota State Mavericks in the NCAA Men's Division I Western Collegiate Hockey Association (WCHA). Palmquist's outstanding play was rewarded with a selection to the All-WCHA First Team in both the 2013–14 and 2014–15 seasons.

On March 30, 2015, Palmquist signed as an undrafted free agent to a one-year entry level contract with home state NHL team, the Minnesota Wild.

Palmquist played four seasons within Minnesota's AHL affiliate, the Iowa Wild, before leaving as a free agent following the 2017–18 campaign. On August 31, 2018, he agreed to continue in the AHL by securing a one-year deal with the Lehigh Valley Phantoms, the primary affiliate to the Philadelphia Flyers.

Career statistics

Awards and honors

References

External links 

1990 births
Living people
American men's ice hockey defensemen
Iowa Wild players
Lehigh Valley Phantoms players
Minnesota State Mavericks men's ice hockey players
Waterloo Black Hawks players
People from South St. Paul, Minnesota
Ice hockey players from Minnesota
AHCA Division I men's ice hockey All-Americans

Minnesota State University, Mankato alumni